Ankit Dabas (born 14 November 1992) is an Indian cricketer who plays for Jharkhand. He made his List A debut on 10 December 2015 in the 2015–16 Vijay Hazare Trophy. He made his Twenty20 debut on 3 January 2016 in the 2015–16 Syed Mushtaq Ali Trophy.

References

External links
 

1992 births
Living people
Indian cricketers
Jharkhand cricketers
Cricketers from Delhi